Craig Willis (born 4 February 1995) is an English rugby union player who plays for Ealing Trailfinders in the RFU Championship.

The fly-half played for Newcastle Falcons between 2013 and 2018, signing his first professional contract with the Falcons after completing studies at Durham School having developed from a young age at Billingham RUFC. He went on to make 39 appearances for Newcastle Falcons. As well as earning the academy player of the season award in the 2015/16 season, his Premiership debut came against Saracens in 2015, and he then kicked the winning penalty against Bath just a month later as he familiarised himself with English rugby’s top tier. He scored a total of 121 points for Newcastle and is known as an expansive and attacking fly-half.

Currently playing at Ealing Trailfinders in West London in the RFU Championship, he has gone on to make over 50 appearances for the club so far.

References

External links 

Ealing Trailfinders Bio - Craig Willis

1995 births
Living people
Newcastle Falcons players
Ealing Trailfinders Rugby Club players
People educated at Durham School